Rochkind is a surname. Notable people with the surname include: 

Marc Rochkind, American computer scientist
Shimon Rochkind, Israeli clinician and neurosurgeon